Hall's Opera Block, also known as Clark's Opera House and Avon Opera Block, is a historic commercial building located at Avon in Livingston County, New York.  It is a three-story, two part commercial block completed in 1876 in the Italianate style.  It has a symmetrical seven bay principal facade with iron and glass storefronts on the first floor.  The top floor performance space was a central gathering place for the community, where citizens of all ranks could congregate to attend theatrical performances, lectures, dances, political meetings, and school graduations.  In November 2007, the village of Avon received a $500,000 state grant to renovate the historic building.

It was listed on the National Register of Historic Places in 2006.

References

Commercial buildings on the National Register of Historic Places in New York (state)
Italianate architecture in New York (state)
Commercial buildings completed in 1876
Buildings and structures in Livingston County, New York
National Register of Historic Places in Livingston County, New York